Dan Riccio is Apple's former senior vice president of Hardware Engineering, reporting to CEO Tim Cook. Riccio lead the Mac, iPhone, iPad, iPod, Apple TV, HomePod, AirPods, and Apple Watch engineering teams, which have produced numerous products. He was succeeded by John Ternus on January 25, 2021. He is now in an unnamed role focusing on a new project at Apple.

Biography
Riccio holds a Doctor of Humanities honoris causa from the University of Massachusetts Medical School and a bachelor's degree in mechanical engineering from the University of Massachusetts Amherst.

Before Apple, Riccio worked at Compaq as senior manager of mechanical engineering, responsible for the mechanical design of consumer PC products.

He joined Apple in 1998 as vice president of product design and in 2010 was named vice president of iPad hardware engineering. Since joining Apple, Riccio has been a key contributor to most of the company's hardware, including all iPad products.

Riccio officially announced the cancellation of AirPower in 2019. On January 26, 2021, Apple announced that Riccio would transition to a new role focusing on a new project and reporting to CEO Tim Cook.

On January 25, 2021, he was succeeded by John Ternus as SVP of hardware engineering, and has transitioned to an unnamed role at Apple working on a new project, rumored to be an augmented reality and virtual reality headset.

References

Year of birth missing (living people)
Living people
Apple Inc. executives
Apple Inc. employees
American people of Italian descent
University of Massachusetts Amherst College of Engineering alumni